Anđela Ignjatović (born 19 May 2001), known professionally as Breskvica, is a Serbian singer.

Life and career
Ignjatović was born on 19 May 2001 in Belgrade.  She plays the piano and guitar. 

She released her debut single "Utopia" in early 2019. The same year she signed a record deal with the label Generacija Zed. From 2019 to 2021 she collaborated on numerous occasions with her ex-boyfriend Voyage. At the 2020 Music Awards Ceremony, Ignjatović won the YouTube Star award for her collaboration "Vrati me" (Return Me) with Voyage. In 2021, Ignjatović parted ways with Voyage and continued to release music as a solo artist. She signed a new record deal with Toxic Entertainment and released her second solo single "Srećan put" (Have a Good Journey). In early 2022, Ignjatović released two singles, "Maska" (Mask) and a collaboration with MC Stojan titled "Život si moj" (You're My Life). The later became her first song to chart on Billboard's newly introduced Croatia Songs chart. In late 2022, she collaborated with Henny on the track "Sava i Dunav" (Sava and Danube), which fast turned into one of her most successful songs. Breskvica began the year 2023 with the single "Sa anđelima" (With Angels).

Personal life 
Ignjatović was in a relationship with fellow musician Voyage. The couple broke up in January 2021 after two years of dating.

Discography

Singles

As lead artist

As featured artist

References

External links
 

2000 births
Living people
Singers from Belgrade
21st-century Serbian women singers
Serbian pop singers
Trap musicians